Steven O'Donnell (born 19 May 1963 in Oldham) is an English actor.

Before O'Donnell became an actor, he spent five years working at Charing Cross Hospital as a Scientific Officer in a medical laboratory. He has appeared in several comedies with Rik Mayall, including The Comic Strip, Bottom, and the film Guest House Paradiso. He also starred in various advertisements in the United Kingdom for Sega in the mid 1990s, for systems such as the Mega Drive, Master System and Game Gear.

Television

Filmography

Radio
 1995: Old Harry's Game as The Demon Gary

References

External links
 

1963 births
English male television actors
English male film actors
English people of Irish descent
Living people